Thryptomene costata is a species of flowering plant in the family Myrtaceae and is endemic to Western Australia. It is an erect shrub with upward pointing, egg-shaped leaves with the narrower end towards the base, and white or pink flowers with five petals and ten stamens.

Description
Flowering occurs from May to November.

Taxonomy
Thryptomene costata was first formally described in 2001 by Barbara Lynette Rye and Malcolm Eric Trudgen in the journal Nuytsia from specimens collected by Trudgen in 1978. The specific epithet (costata) means "ribbed", referring to the floral cup.

Distribution and habitat
This thryptomene grows on granite outcrops and other rocky places between Cue and Wubin and from Tallering Peak to near Menzies in the Avon Wheatbelt, Coolgardie, Murchison and Yalgoo biogeographic regions.

Conservation status
Thryptomene costata is classified as "not threatened" by the Western Australian Government Department of Parks and Wildlife.

References

costata
Endemic flora of Western Australia
Rosids of Western Australia
Plants described in 2001
Taxa named by Barbara Lynette Rye
Taxa named by Malcolm Eric Trudgen